The New Zealand PGA Championship is a golf tournament on the PGA Tour of Australasia.

History
The tournament been played since 1909, with some gap periods. It was originally a match play event and switched to stroke play in 1965. Major championship winners who have claimed the New Zealand PGA title include Sir Bob Charles, Peter Thomson, Kel Nagle, and Tony Jacklin. The event is also notable for Masashi Ozaki's lone international win.

Sponsorship problems caused the tournament to be terminated after the 1987 event. In 2002, a PGA Tour of Australasia and U.S.-based Nationwide Tour co-sanctioned event, called the Holden Clearwater Classic  was started at the Clearwater Resort in Christchurch, New Zealand. It was played again in 2003 and in 2004 the event resumed the name New Zealand PGA Championship. Co-sanctioning with the Nationwide Tour ended after 2009. The event was not held in 2020 and was run in 2021 as a non-tour event.

Winners

Sources:

Notes

References

External links
Coverage on the PGA Tour of Australasia's official site

PGA Tour of Australasia events
Former Korn Ferry Tour events
Golf tournaments in New Zealand
Recurring sporting events established in 1920
1920 establishments in New Zealand